The 1959 Akron Zips football team represented Akron University in the 1959 NCAA College Division football season as a member of the Ohio Athletic Conference. Led by sixth-year head coach Joe McMullen, the Zips played their home games at the Rubber Bowl in Akron, Ohio. They finished the season with a record of 4–5 overall and 4–3 in OAC play. They were outscored by their opponents 119–155.

Schedule

References

Akron
Akron Zips football seasons
Akron Zips football